The 2017 OKC Energy FC season is the club's fourth season in existence, and their fourth season playing in the USL, the 2nd tier of the American soccer pyramid.

Background 
This is the first season where USL will produced and broadcast all of Energy FC games. Last season the games was on KSBI. It has not be announced yet if the games will be on televised or just be online. It was announced that all Energy FC matches will be televised on News 9 Plus formally KSBI. Except if the matches being televised on ESPN network

Review

Roster 
As of 3/24/2017

Competitions

USL

Results summary

USL Playoffs

First round

Conference Semi-Finals

Conference Finals

Standings

U.S. Open Cup 

OKC Energy FC will enter Open Cup in the Second Round.

Statistics

Transfers

Transfers In

Loans in

References 

2017 USL season
American soccer clubs 2017 season
2017 in sports in Oklahoma
2017